The Texas Hill Country Trail is a non-profit organization which promotes heritage tourism, economic development, and historic preservation. It is one of ten regions which make up the Texas Heritage Trails Program of the Texas Historical Commission.

History
In 1968 Texas hosted the World's fair, known as HemisFair '68, in San Antonio, Texas. In connection with this boost in international attention, the Texas Department of Transportation designated ten 650-mile circular driving regions that encompassed the entire state of Texas. These trails saw little attention after their creation until in the late 1990s when the Texas Historical Commission adopted these trails as their Heritage Trail Program.

See also
Texas Heritage Trails Program

References

External links
Texas Hill Country Trail

Organizations based in Texas